The 1941 Portland Pilots football team was an American football team that represented the University of Portland as an independent during the 1941 college football season. In its fifth year under head coach Robert L. Mathews, the team compiled a 3–5 record. The team played its home games at Multnomah Stadium in Portland, Oregon.

Schedule

References

Portland
Portland Pilots football seasons
Portland Pilots football
Portland Pilots football